Jackson Burns (July 29, 1956 - November 24, 2016) was an American stunt performer, stunt coordinator, writer, and actor.

Biography
Burns was born on July 7, 1956 in Poteau, Oklahoma. He is only child of Luther Jackson Burns and Ermaline Delora Lockhart.  Burns is of Native American ancestry. Born in an economically depressed region, known to be the poorest in the state of Oklahoma (Little Dixie).  His father is of French, Scot-Irish and Cherokee heritage. His mother is of English, Scot, Irish and Choctaw heritage. His father Luther, quit school in 6th grade to help work and take care of his sharecropper parents (also of very limited education) and his siblings. His mother Delora finished high school. Jackson finished high school and graduated in the Class of 1974, Heavener High School, Heavener, Oklahoma. Jackson also attended Northeastern State University at Tahlequah, Oklahoma for a brief period. Jackson has said that never finishing his education is what has been his most damaging point in his life.
Known as Action Jackson for his work in the stunt industry, Burns runs his stunt and special effects company Action Jackson Stunts, based in Houston, Texas
He has worked on Walker, Texas Ranger; The Con; and Fingerprints. His fire drag stunt from a vehicle at 246 feet totally engulfed Burns in flames at one point and damaged his Nomex fire suit ; Burns took 22 squib hits at once, 22 total in 15 seconds; and as stunt double for George Kennedy on the motion picture The Man Who Came Back, was dragged from the back of a horse for a total distance of 282 feet. Jackson, was hit by a car at 17 mph as stunt double for James Gandolfini on the motion picture Dance with the Devil. This is considerably faster than normal stunt car hits and Burns broke the windshield, flew over the top of the car and rolled off of the back, without a scratch. He later performed a car hit for the same actor and movie, of which he launched himself from an 18 wheel truck into the windshield of a passing pickup truck and then rolled to the ground. Gandolfini is said to have based his stuntman character in Get Shorty on Jackson.

Burns has worked in many fields including lumberjack, pipeliner, heavy equipment operator, hydrostatic tester, private investigator, Olan Mills portrait photographer, karate instructor, motorcycle racer, door installer, salesman and amusement park supervisor until he broke into the movie stunt business.

His work on movies and television has won much acclaim and many awards and Burns is now working on a longtime passion through a character that he is developing for a television project called The Redneck Archaeologist. In this character Burns travels the world finding unknown historical and archaeological sites and artifacts. He now has a widely watched YouTube Channel that he is getting attention with.

His work as a community activist and precinct chair has been recognized by the Mayor Bill White of Houston, his work on elections was recognized by a resolution in his name issued by Harris County Commissioners Court.

Married to the Mexican actress/model Nelly Castrejon, they have one son and now live in Houston, Texas.

According to IMDb, he died on November 24, 2016, aged 60, in Houston, Texas, USA.

See also 
 Walker Texas Ranger 3: Deadly Reunion (1994 film)

References

External links
 
 Adventure To The Unexplained.com

1956 births
2016 deaths
American stunt performers
People from Poteau, Oklahoma
American people of Cherokee descent
American people of Choctaw descent
21st-century American historians
21st-century American male writers
American male film actors
American male television actors
Male actors from Oklahoma
Male actors from Houston
Film producers from Texas
Activists from Houston
Film producers from Oklahoma
Historians from Oklahoma
Historians from Texas
American male non-fiction writers